Louis Childs Madeira III (February 5, 1892 – March 20, 1943) was an American track and field athlete who competed in the 1912 Summer Olympics.

In 1912 he participated in the 1500 metres competition and qualified for the final. His exact result is unknown but he finished between ninth and 14th place.

Madeira's success in track at the University of Pennsylvania is honored on the medal for the Penn Relays. His likeness is the second athlete meeting Benjamin Franklin.

References

External links
list of American athletes

1892 births
1943 deaths
University of Pennsylvania people
American male middle-distance runners
Olympic track and field athletes of the United States
Athletes (track and field) at the 1912 Summer Olympics